The Louisiana State Senate is the upper house of the state legislature of Louisiana. All senators serve four-year terms and are assigned to multiple committees.

Composition 
The Louisiana State Senate is composed of 39 senators elected from single-member districts from across the state of Louisiana by the electors thereof. Senators must be a qualified elector (registered voter), be at least eighteen years of age, be domiciled in their district for at least one year, and must have been a resident of the state for at least two years. The senate is the judge of its members' qualifications and elections. All candidates for a senate seat in a district run in a nonpartisan blanket primary and in a runoff if necessary. Elections to the Senate occur every four years and senators are limited to three four-year terms (12 years). If a seat is vacated early during a term then it will be filled in a special election. Senate sessions occur every year, along with the Louisiana House of Representatives. The Senate convenes for sixty legislative days in general session in even-numbered years, and for forty-five days in appropriations session in odd-numbered years. The Senate is the upper legislative chamber of the Louisiana State Legislature and, along with the Louisiana House of Representatives, is the legislative power of the state of Louisiana. In addition it tries officials impeached by the House of Representatives and confirms or rejects officials nominated by the governor of Louisiana.

Members

Committee assignments
The Louisiana State Senate currently has over fifteen different committees in which the senators sit. These committees address a wide range of issues such as environmental quality, education, labor relations and more . A full list of the committees can be found at the senate committees page. Likewise, a full list of committee assignments (by member) can be found at the committee assignments page.

President of the senate 

The president of the Louisiana State Senate is the presiding officer of the Louisiana State Senate and the highest-ranking state senator. The President is elected by the members of the state senate. Although not mandated by law or the Louisiana Constitution, the governor usually chooses the president, who in turn is usually elected by a near-unanimous, if not unanimous, vote. The president is usually chosen from the majority party, even if it is not the governor's party, although this is not always the case. One example of this is when Republican Governor Mike Foster chose Republican State Senator John J. Hainkel Jr. to serve as senate president even though the Democrats had a large majority. One factor that allows for this is that the Governor usually has support on both sides of the aisle when he first enters office so his appointees, including the senate president, are usually confirmed easily.

The president is fifth in the line of succession to the governorship after the lieutenant governor, secretary of state, attorney general,
and state treasurer.

History

Early years
The Louisiana Constitution of 1812 did not provide for a lieutenant governor to succeed to the governorship in case of the governor's death, resignation or removal from office, neither would there be a lieutenant governor to preside over the state senate, instead it provided that the President would serve as the state senate's presiding officer and become acting governor until the seating of an elected governor. The first senate president to succeed to the governorship was Henry S. Thibodaux, who succeeded to the position in 1824 after the resignation of Governor Thomas B. Robertson. Thibodaux served for one month before the Governor-elect, Henry Johnson, took office. In 1829, Governor Pierre Derbigny died in a carriage accident, allowing for Senate President Armand Beauvais to become acting governor. Beauvais resigned after only three months in 1830 to run in the special election to fill the post. The new senate president, Jacques Dupré, became the new acting governor until he resigned in 1831 and was replaced by governor-elect André B. Roman.

Lieutenant governor as president
In the Louisiana Constitution of 1846, the lieutenant governor of Louisiana assumed the functions of the senate presidency. This arrangement lasted until 1976. The first lieutenant governor to preside over the Senate was Trasimond Landry who served from 1846 until 1850. During the Civil War there were two lieutenant governors, one union, and one confederate, as there were two separate state governments. During the Reconstruction the post was held by Republicans, thereafter the chair was held by Democrats for over a hundred years.

Democratic domination (1877–1976)
From the end of the Reconstruction in 1877 until the appointment of John Hainkel in 2000, the senate chair was held by Democrats. During this time most lieutenant governors were allies of the Governor, with notable exceptions. During this time several senate presidents pro tempore became acting lieutenant governor due to the premature vacating of the office of lieutenant governor. On at least two occasions it was due to the ascension of the lieutenant governor to the governorship, in the case of the others it was because of the death, resignation or removal of the lieutenant governor. When the seat was vacated the president pro tempore became acting lieutenant governor in accordance with the constitution, and on two occasions the president pro tempore became governor. In 1976, with the implementation of the Louisiana Constitution of 1974, the lieutenant governor assumed executive duties and the gavel once again passed to a senate-elected president. 1976 also saw Virginia Shehee become the first woman elected to the Louisiana State Senate.

Two-party system (1976–present)
The reinstatement of the elected senate presidency and the installation of a new constitution brought with it something Louisiana had not seen since the 1850s: a two-party system. Also new to the presidency the practicing of appointing of the president by the governor. This practice had been applied to the state House Speakership for years. The first elected Senate President under the new constitution was Michael H. O'Keefe Sr., an ally of Edwin Edwards, who was elected to his second term as governor in 1975. In 1980 something that had not happened since the Reconstruction became a reality; a Republican governor was in office. David Treen was elected in 1979, and with him came more Republican legislators, although only an enlarged minority. O'Keefe retained the senate presidency under Treen until he was forced to resign the presidency after convictions in federal court.

In 2000, although still in the minority, Republican John Hainkel, who served as speaker of the House as a Democrat under Treen, was appointed by Republican Governor Murphy J. Foster, Jr. to be senate president, the first Republican in over a century. In 2011 the Republicans obtained a majority in the senate, a Republican John Alario, a Democratic speaker of the House under Edwin Edwards from 1984 to 1988 and again from 1992 to 1996, was appointed senate president by Republican Governor Bobby Jindal, joining Hainkel as the only men to be elected as Speaker of the House and Senate President in Louisiana's history. Alario retained the position when Democrat John Bel Edwards was elected in 2015.

In 2020, Republican Patrick Page Cortez was elected senate president when Alario retired due to term limits.

Powers

The president of the Senate serves as the presiding officer and head of the senate. The president gives the senators their committee assignment although the assignments are already predetermined by the governor and his office. During legislative sessions the president can play a key role in the passage or rejection of legislation in the legislature, due to the office's prestige, power, and influence. If a senator supports the governor's agenda the president may promote them to more powerful committees, or even appoint them chairman or vice chairmanships. The president usually maintains a strong hold on the senate and legislation through his appointment of committee memberships and committee chairmen. The president has the power to rule on points of order recognize senators so they may speak and control the flow of legislation through the senate. The senate president is almost always an ally of the Governor, this allows the administration to pass their legislative agenda through easier and it allows them to kill opposition legislation easier too. The senate president is usually a powerful and influential senator before he is appointed senate president. If a senate seat falls vacant before the expiration f its term the senate president calls for an election, he sets the date, times, and places of voting. Upon the petition of a majority of the members of the legislature the President along with the Speakers calls a special session. The senate president is fifth in the gubernatorial line of succession. If the president is ever absent the senate president pro tempore, who is also appointed by the governor, presides. Should the senate chair ever fall permanently vacant the senate president pro tempore presides until the election of a new president.

Past composition of the senate

See also
President of the Louisiana State Senate
Louisiana Legislature
Louisiana House of Representatives

References

External links 
 The Louisiana State Senate official government website
State Senate of Louisiana at Project Vote Smart

Louisiana State Legislature
State upper houses in the United States